Suat Soyer (1879–1942) was a Turkish physician and liberal politician.

References 

1879 births
1942 deaths
20th-century Turkish politicians
Place of death missing
People from İzmir
20th-century Turkish physicians
20th-century physicians from the Ottoman Empire